Joseph Merhi, CML (18 January 1912 in Mreijat, Lebanon – 30 March 2006) was a Maronite Bishop of the Maronite Catholic Eparchy of Cairo in Egypt.

Life

Joseph Merhi entered into the Congregation of Maronite Lebanese Missionaries and received his priestly ordination on 13 July 1936.

On 24 August 1972 Pope Paul VI appointed him bishop of the Eparchy of Cairo for the Maronites. His episcopal ordination was performed on 26 August 1972 by Maronite Patriarch of Antioch Paul Peter Meouchi; his co-consecrators were Nasrallah Boutros Sfeir, Titular bishop of Tarsus dei Maroniti  and Archbishop Ignace Abdo Khalifé, Titutar Archbishop of Apamea in Syria dei Maroniti.

As usual in his church, he made his retirement for the completion of his 75th birthday on 5 June 1989.

On 30 March 2006 Emeritus Bishop Merhi died.

See also

References

External links
 http://www.catholic-hierarchy.org/bishop/bmerhij.html 

1912 births
2006 deaths
Lebanese clergy
20th-century Maronite Catholic bishops